McQuaide is a surname of Irish origin, from the County Monaghan and other surrounding areas in Ulster. It originated as a variation of McCaul, and similar spellings include McQuade and McQuaid. Notable people with the surname include:

 Franklin McQuaide (1887–1954), American police chief
 Jake McQuaide (born 1987), American football player

See also
McCaul
McQuade
McQuaid
 Camp McQuaide, former United States Army camp in California